Union Park Street is a street-level bus station on the Washington Street branch of the MBTA MBTA Silver Line bus rapid transit service in the  South End neighborhood of Boston, Massachusetts. The bus stops are staggered - the inbound (northbound) stop is just north of Union Park Street, while the outbound stop is just south of West Dedham Street a block to the south. The southbound stop was located at Union Park Street until around 2006. Like all Silver Line stops, Union Park Street is accessible.

Silver Line service on Washington Street began on July 20, 2002, replacing the route 49 bus. Service levels doubled on October 15, 2009, with the introduction of the SL4 route.

References

External links
MBTA: Washington St @ Union Pk southbound and northbound

Silver Line (MBTA) stations